War Story is a 2014 American drama film directed by Mark Jackson and starring Catherine Keener, Hafsia Herzi and Ben Kingsley. Screenplay is by Kristin Gore, music by Dave Eggar, Chuck Palmer, and Amy Lee, and cinematography by Reed Morano.

The film had its world premiere at 2014 Sundance Film Festival on January 19, 2014. The film later screened at 2014 International Film Festival Rotterdam.

Premise
A war photographer, Lee goes to Sicily instead of going back home to New York City, to forget about being taken hostage in Libya. In Sicily, she crosses paths with her former lover and mentor Albert and tries to help Hafsia, a young Tunisian migrant, escape to France.

Cast
Catherine Keener as Lee
Hafsia Herzi as Hafsia
Ben Kingsley as Albert
Donatella Finocchiaro as Daria
Vincenzo Amato as Filippo

Music
Music for the film was written and composed by Amy Lee, singer of American rock band Evanescence, and Dave Eggar. The soundtrack album was released on August 25, 2014.

Reception
War Story received a mixed to negative response from critics, with a 47% rating on rotten tomatoes. Todd McCarthy in his review for The Hollywood Reporter praised the film, calling it "A compelling, beautifully filmed character study of a war zone photographer in personal turmoil." Mark Adams of Screen International praised the film by saying that it is "A dense and taut drama, a study on post-traumatic stress disorder that at its best is strikingly tense and heavy with sadness." Chris Michael in his review for The Guardian, gave the film three out of five stars and said that "Catherine Keener exudes dark anxiety in Mark Jackson's tale of the European immigrant experience."

Accolades

References

External links
 
 

2014 films
American independent films
Films scored by Amy Lee
Films set in Sicily
American drama films
2014 drama films
2014 independent films
2010s English-language films
2010s American films